Chen Po-jen (born 11 May 1998) is a Taiwanese weightlifter. He represented Chinese Taipei at the 2020 Summer Olympics in Tokyo, Japan. He competed in the men's 96 kg event.

In 2018, he represented Chinese Taipei at the Asian Games held in Jakarta, Indonesia in the men's 94 kg event.

In 2021, he competed at the 2020 Asian Weightlifting Championships held in Tashkent, Uzbekistan.

He won the silver medal in his event at the 2022 Asian Weightlifting Championships held in Manama, Bahrain.

References

External links 
 

Living people
1998 births
Place of birth missing (living people)
Taiwanese male weightlifters
Weightlifters at the 2018 Asian Games
Asian Games competitors for Chinese Taipei
Weightlifters at the 2020 Summer Olympics
Olympic weightlifters of Taiwan
21st-century Taiwanese people